Julian Roger Hallam (born 4 May 1966) is a British environmental activist, a co-founder of Extinction Rebellion, cooperative federation organisation Radical Routes and the political party Burning Pink.

Biography
Hallam was raised by a Methodist family. He was previously an organic farmer on a  smallholding near Llandeilo in South Wales; he attributes the destruction of his business to a series of extreme weather events.

Between at least 2017 and early 2019 he was studying for a PhD at King's College London, researching how to achieve social change through civil disobedience and radical movements.

In January 2017, in an action to urge King's College London to divest from fossil fuels, Hallam and another person, using water-soluble chalk-based spray paint, painted "Divest from oil and gas", "Now!" and "Out of time" on the university's Strand campus entrance. They were arrested in February when they again spray painted the university's Great Hall, charged with criminal damage and fined £500.

In May 2019, after a three-day trial at Southwark Crown Court, they were cleared by a jury of all charges, having argued in their defence that their actions were a proportionate response to the climate crisis. In March 2017, Hallam went on hunger strike to demand the university divest from fossil fuels—the institution had millions of pounds invested in fossil fuels but no investment in renewable energy. Five weeks after the first protest, the university removed £14m worth of investments from fossil fuel companies and pledged to become carbon neutral by 2025.

Later in 2017, Hallam was a leading member of activist group Stop Killing Londoners an anti-pollution campaign of mass civil disobedience that they hoped would result in the arrest and imprisonment of activists. Hallam with Stuart Basden and two others were prosecuted and some pledged to go on hunger strike if imprisoned.

Hallam is a co-founder of environmental pressure group Extinction Rebellion, with Gail Bradbrook and Simon Bramwell. He stood unsuccessfully in the 2019 European Parliament election in the London constituency as an independent, winning 924 of the 2,241,681 votes cast (0.04%).

Hallam was interviewed by Stephen Sackur on BBC HARDtalk on 15August 2019.

Hallam and four other activists were arrested on suspicion of conspiracy to cause a public nuisance on 12 September 2019, the day before a planned action to pilot drones in the exclusion zone around Heathrow Airport in order to disrupt flights. Three days later, in an action organised by Heathrow Pause, Hallam was arrested in the vicinity of Heathrow Airport apparently in breach of bail conditions from the previous arrest requiring him to not to be within  of any airport or possess drone equipment. He was remanded in custody until 14 October.

In an interview with Die Zeit on 20 November 2019, Hallam said genocides are "like a regular event" in history and called the Holocaust "just another fuckery in human history". This comment was made in the context of a broader discussion on genocides throughout human history, where Hallam compared the Nazi Holocaust to the Congo genocide; as he stated the "fact of the matter is, millions of people have been killed in vicious circumstances on a regular basis throughout history" adding that the Belgians "went to the Congo in the late 19th century and decimated it." Hallam's controversial comparison has drawn support from African activists the Stop the Maangamizi: We Charge Genocide/Ecocide! Campaign, who, while critical of the tone of his language, have lauded his honesty and willingness to highlight crimes committed by colonial powers in Africa.

In a self-published pamphlet written in prison, Hallam wrote that the climate crisis would lead to mass rape, and featured a story in which the reader's female family members are gang raped and the reader forced to watch. The pamphlet was condemned by Farah Nazeer, CEO of Women's Aid. When Der Spiegel replied to Hallam that "You can't blame the climate change for the rape of women during war", Hallam's response was "No, climate change is just the tubes that the gas comes down in the gas chamber. It's just a mechanism through which one generation kills the next generation".

Publications

Publications by Hallam
Common Sense for the 21st Century: Only Nonviolent Rebellion Can Now Stop Climate Breakdown and Social Collapse. Self-published, 2019. .

Publications with contributions by Hallam

See also
Environmental law
Fossil fuels lobby

Notes

References

External links

Roger Hallam on The Guardian

British environmentalists
Climate activists
Living people
1966 births
Independent British political candidates
Extinction Rebellion
Organic farmers
21st-century British politicians
People from Llandeilo
Alumni of King's College London
British political party founders
Leaders of political parties in the United Kingdom